Pain Shirud (also Romanized as Pā’īn Shīrūd; also known as Shīrrūd, Shīrūd, and Sīrūd) is a village in Goli Jan Rural District, in the Central District of Tonekabon County, Mazandaran Province, Iran. At the 2006 census, its population was 1,763, in 490 families.

References 

Populated places in Tonekabon County